BEHS may refer to:
 Bishop England High School, Charleston, South Carolina, United States
 Box Elder High School, Brigham City, Utah, United States
 Brookfield East High School, Brookfield, Wisconsin, United States
 Bullitt East High School, Mount Washington, Kentucky, United States
 Burlington-Edison High School, Burlington, Washington, United States
 Basic Education High School, the designation of a number of schools in Burma; see Education in Myanmar